Mark Ivan Kendall (born 10 December 1961) is an English former professional footballer who played in the Football League for Northampton Town and Birmingham City. He played as a goalkeeper.

Career
Kendall was born in Nuneaton, Warwickshire, and attended Polesworth School. He joined Aston Villa in 1976. Kendall played in Aston Villa's youth teams which lost in the final of the 1978 FA Youth Cup final but were winners two years later. While with Aston Villa, Kendall was capped for England at youth level, and played 18 games for the reserves, but never appeared for the first team. He joined Fourth Division club Northampton Town on a free transfer in 1982.

He played 11 times in the Football League for Northampton, and moved on to Birmingham City of the First Division in March 1984 as cover for Tony Coton. He played once in the 1983–84 season, deputising for Coton in a game at home to Arsenal which resulted in a 1–1 draw. After leaving Birmingham Kendall joined Tamworth, where he contributed to the club's winning the West Midlands (Regional) League title in 1988. After Tamworth he went on play for a number of non-league teams, mostly in the Midlands area, including Mile Oak Rovers, Hitchin Town, Worcester City, Atherstone Town, Bedworth United, Willenhall and Polesworth North Warwick.

Kendall has coached the Tamworth Junior League XI, and has represented former club Birmingham City in Masters football.

Honours
with Aston Villa
 FA Youth Cup winners: 1980
 FA Youth Cup runners-up: 1978
with Tamworth
 West Midlands (Regional) League champions: 1987–88

References

1961 births
Living people
Sportspeople from Nuneaton
English footballers
Association football goalkeepers
Aston Villa F.C. players
Northampton Town F.C. players
Birmingham City F.C. players
Tamworth F.C. players
Mile Oak Rovers F.C. players
Hitchin Town F.C. players
Worcester City F.C. players
Atherstone Town F.C. players
Bedworth United F.C. players
Willenhall Town F.C. players
Polesworth North Warwick F.C. players
English Football League players